Cape Verdean may refer to:
 Something of, from, or related to the country of Cape Verde
 A person from Cape Verde, or of Cape Verdean descent:
 Cape Verdeans
 Cape Verdean Americans
 Demographics of Cape Verde
 List of Cape Verdeans
 Cape Verdean Creole, a language
 Cape Verdean cuisine

See also 
 

Language and nationality disambiguation pages